The brown spider monkey or variegated spider monkey (Ateles hybridus) is a critically endangered species of spider monkey, a type of New World monkey, from forests in northern Colombia and northwestern Venezuela.

Like all spider monkeys, it has long, slender limbs and a long prehensile tail. The brown spider monkey has a whitish belly and patch on the forehead, and – highly unusual among spider monkeys – its eyes can be pale blue.

The brown spider monkey is one of the most threatened primates in the Neotropics and has been listed six times on The World's 25 Most Endangered Primates.

Taxonomy 

Some scientists recognise two subspecies, Ateles hybridus hybridus, found in both Colombia and Venezuela and Ateles hybridus brunneus, found between Cauca and Magdalena River in Colombia. Molecular studies have not supported the subspecies designations and treat the species as a single taxon.

Physical description 

The brown spider monkey has long and thin limbs with longer forelimbs than hind limbs. The tail has a highly flexible, hairless tip with skin grooves which improves grip. Its fingers are curved and it has small thumbs. These features make it possible for it to climb trees at high elevations, and hang and swing from one tree to another without often having to return to the ground. Its coloration ranges from light brown to dark on upper parts including the head. Its most distinctive characteristic is a whitish triangular forehead patch, although not all individuals have one. Some have pale blue eyes but most are brown.

Distribution 

The brown spider monkey is found in northern Colombia and northwestern Venezuela. In Colombia, it is found from the right bank of the Magdalena River in the Magdalena and Cesar Departments, the south western portions of Guajira in the northernmost parts of the Serrania de Perija, and in the middle Magdalena River Valley at least to the Caldas and Cundinamarca Departments.

Ecology and behaviour 

Even though the brown spider monkey spends most of its time high in trees, it occasionally descends to eat soil and drink water. Since it forages in high canopies, it prefers undisturbed primary forests. The brown spider monkey travels in small groups, and instead of walking or running on all fours, it travels mostly by swinging and climbing between trees.

The brown spider monkey mainly forages in the forest canopy and relies mostly on its senses of sight, smell, taste, and touch to find food. It is mainly herbivorous and frugivorous.  A main component of the brown spider monkey's diet is ripe fruit. Over three quarters of its diet is lipid-rich fruits. However, in drier seasons where fruit is less abundant, it feeds on leaves, seeds, flowers, bark, honey, decaying wood, and occasionally insects such as termites and caterpillars. The brown spider monkey feeds on different species of figs year around. Scientists have observed it eating soil and clay, and hypothesized that the reasons for this behavior could be to obtain minerals from the soil, for example phosphorus, or in order to maintain a pH-balance in its digestive system. The brown spider monkey finds water to drink on the forest floor at "salado sites." Competition for food occurs between spider monkeys and other frugivorous primates.

Average lifespan of a spider monkey is 27 years, however, in captivity it can reach 40 years old.

Natural predators include jaguars (Panthera onca), mountain lions (Puma concolor), harpy eagles (Harpia harpyja), and crested eagles (Morphnus guianensis). The brown spider monkey is known to shake branches in order to ward off potential predators.

Conservation 

The brown spider monkey is one of the most threatened primates in the Neotropics. The population is estimated to have decreased by at least 80% and some populations have already been extirpated. Few remaining populations are of adequate size to be viable long-term. Almost 60 brown spider monkeys were recorded at various zoo (mostly European) that participated in the International Species Information System in 2010, but breeding is slow. Habitat loss is ongoing within its wild range, and an estimated 98% of its habitat already is gone. Habitat loss is driven both by logging, and land clearance for agriculture and cattle ranches. It is also threatened by hunting (in some regions it is the favorite game) and the wild animals trade. One study did not show a significant difference between population densities inside versus outside forest areas disturbed by loggers. It has been hypothesized that this anomaly is due to the sample being taken from El Paujil reserve, which is a protected area and may serve as refuge from other human activities, namely poaching.

This is the southernmost population of the brown spider monkey. Brown spider monkeys are also known from other reserves in both Colombia and Venezuela.

References

External links 

ARKive - images and movies of the variegated spider monkey (Ateles hybridus)

brown spider monkey
Primates of South America
Mammals of Colombia
Mammals of Venezuela
brown spider monkey
Taxa named by Isidore Geoffroy Saint-Hilaire
Articles containing video clips